There have been six baronetcies created for persons with the surname Smyth (as distinct from Smythe and Smith), two in the Baronetage of England, one in the Baronetage of Great Britain, one in the Baronetage of Ireland and two in the Baronetage of the United Kingdom. One creation is extant as of 2010.

The Smyth Baronetcy, of Redcliff in the County of Buckingham, was created in the Baronetage of England on 10 May 1661 for William Smyth, a staunch Royalist, Governor of Hillersden and a member of the Long Parliament. The title became extinct on the death of the second Baronet in 1732.

The Smyth Baronetcy, of Upton in the County of Essex, was created in the Baronetage of England on 30 March 1665 for Robert Smyth of Upton, West Ham, Essex. He was succeeded by his eldest son, the second Baronet. The latter's eldest son, the third Baronet, sat as member of parliament for Andover. The fifth Baronet represented Cardigan in the House of Commons. The sixth Baronet was member of parliament for Colchester. The title became extinct on his death in 1852.

James, the second son of the first Baronet, was the father of the first Baronet of Isfield (see below).

The Smyth Baronetcy, of Isfield in the County of Sussex, was created in the Baronetage of Great Britain on 2 December 1714 for James Smyth. His father, Sir James Smyth (1633–1706), Lord Mayor of London, was the second son of the first Baronet of Upton (see above). The third Baronet was aide de camp to General Wolfe at the Battle of Quebec. The title became extinct on his death in 1811.

The Smyth Baronetcy, of Tinny Park in the County of Wicklow, was created in the Baronetage of Ireland on 5 August 1776 for Skeffington Smyth, son of James Smyth of Tinny Park and grandson of Dr Edward Smyth, Bishop of Down and Connor and Mary Skeffington. He was appointed to the Privy Council of Ireland in 1785. The title became extinct on his death in 1797.

The Smyth Baronetcy, of Ashton Court in the County of Somerset, was created in the Baronetage of the United Kingdom on 25 April 1859 for John Henry Greville Smyth. He was born John Henry Greville Upton, grandson of Florence Smyth, heiress in 1849 of the Ashton Court estates of the Smith family of Long Ashton (see (Smith baronets of 1661 and 1763). The title became extinct on his death in 1901 although the wider family retained the estates until 1946.

The Smyth Baronetcy, of Teignmouth in the County of Devon, was created in the Baronetage of the United Kingdom on 23 January 1956 for the soldier and Conservative politician John Smyth. As of 2010, the title is held by his grandson, the second Baronet, who succeeded in 1983.

Smyth baronets, of Redcliff (1661)

Sir William Smyth, 1st Baronet (–1696)
Sir Thomas Smyth, 2nd Baronet (1696–1732)

Smyth baronets, of Upton (1665)

Sir Robert Smyth, 1st Baronet (–1669)
Sir Robert Smyth, 2nd Baronet (c. 1630–d. by 1695)
Sir Robert Smyth, 3rd Baronet (c. 1659–1745)
Sir Trafford Smyth, 4th Baronet (c. 1720–1765)
Sir Robert Smyth, 5th Baronet (1744–1802)
Sir George Henry Smyth, 6th Baronet (1784–1852)

Smyth baronets, of Isfield (1714)
Sir James Smyth, 1st Baronet ( – 1717)
Sir Robert Smyth, 2nd Baronet (c. 1709 – 1783)
Sir Hervey Smyth, 3rd Baronet (1734–1811)

Smyth baronets, of Tinny Park (1776)
Sir Skeffington Smyth, 1st Baronet (1745–1797)

Smyth baronets, of Ashton Court (1859)
Sir John Henry Greville Smyth, 1st Baronet (1836–1901)

Smyth baronets, of Teignmouth (1956)
Sir John George Smyth VC MC, 1st Baronet (1893–1983)
John Lawrence Smyth (1921–1944), eldest son of the 1st Baronet, killed in action at Kohima, India.
Julian Smyth (1923–1974), 2nd son of the 1st Baronet and father of the 2nd Baronet.
Sir Timothy John Smyth, 2nd Baronet (born 1953)

The heir apparent to the Baronetcy is the present holder's eldest son, Brendan Julian Smyth (born 1981)

See also
Smith baronets
Smythe baronets
Bowyer-Smyth baronets

References

Kidd, Charles, Williamson, David (editors). Debrett's Peerage and Baronetage (1990 edition). New York: St Martin's Press, 1990.

Baronetcies in the Baronetage of the United Kingdom
Extinct baronetcies in the Baronetage of England
Extinct baronetcies in the Baronetage of Ireland
Extinct baronetcies in the Baronetage of Great Britain
Extinct baronetcies in the Baronetage of the United Kingdom
1661 establishments in England